The 2012–13 season was Newport County's third consecutive season in the Conference National and 92nd season of league football overall. The season marked the return of association football to Rodney Parade for the first time in 72 years. The club celebrated its centenary in the 2012–13 season by winning promotion to Football League Two after a 25-year absence.

Season review

Introduction

In May 2012, Newport County announced that they had agreed a deal to move to the city's rugby stadium, Rodney Parade. In August 2012 EuroMillions lottery winner Les Scadding succeeded Chris Blight as club Chairman. In February 2013 a further 10-year lease to play at Rodney Parade was signed.

The centenary 2012–13 season saw Newport County finish third in the Conference Premier league, reaching the play-offs for the first time. A 2–0 aggregate win over Grimsby Town in the two-legged play-off semi-final saw Newport County reach the 2013 Conference Premier play-off Final at Wembley Stadium. The final versus Wrexham was the first Wembley final to feature two Welsh teams, and Newport County won 2–0 to return to the Football League after a 25-year absence with promotion to League Two.
County were awarded Freedom of the City of Newport on 17 August 2013 in recognition of this achievement.

League

2012
The season started away to promotion hopefuls Mansfield Town. County were 2–0 up within 13 minutes, but found themselves level at 2–2 five minutes into the second half. Eventually winning 4–3 County were 3rd in the table. After a 4–0 home win to Nuneaton Town County were top of the table and stayed there during a run of five consecutive wins culminating in a 2–0 home victory to local rivals Hereford United — their first visit to Newport since the Welsh Cup clash in 1989. County were now the only team in the division with a 100% record. However, following defeats to 10th-placed Wrexham and 12th-placed Dartford County were back in 3rd place, but the next three games were won and County were back to the top. Following a 0–0 draw with Grimsby Town County were temporarily down to 2nd, but were back at the top after the next six games. Following a shock home defeat to second-bottom Hyde County were down to 2nd on goal difference, but back on top the following game after a 3–1 home win against Gateshead. Despite leading Kidderminster Harriers 2–1 in the next game County lost 3–2 and they were back to 3rd. The home match with Luton Town was won 5–2, taking County back to the top of the table. The last game of 2012 was won away at Forest Green Rovers, but with Grimsby Town having played an extra game County finished the year in 2nd place.

2013
The first fixture of the new year was the home visit of Forest Green Rovers. County were decisively beaten 5–0 and dropped to 3rd in the table as a result. The next match at home to Wrexham ended in a 1–1 draw, which was enough to put Wrexham top of the table, with County staying 3rd, one point behind. County rose to 2nd in the table following the 4–2 away win at Lincoln City, with débutant Robbie Willmott scoring a brace. With momentum in their favour County were desperate to get the home match with bottom-placed Barrow on, but the Rodney Parade pitch was under several feet of snow on the morning of 19 January. Over 120 fans helped to clear the pitch but County went on to lose 2–0. Following that setback, Newport then went on a seven-match unbeaten run, including completing the double over Mansfield Town and Hereford United in the process. The Hereford match being particularly notable for the award of three penalties to Hereford, two of which were scored. In the following match a 90th-minute winner for Kidderminster Harriers resulted in them being the only team to complete double victories over County and move into top place in the table as a result. The next game resulted in a second consecutive County defeat away at Stockport County — Stockport winning 1–0 as a result of a Lee Minshull own goal. County now faced the prospect of the remaining 10 matches in just 26 days. However they went on another unbeaten run, winning at Southport three days later, followed by a 0–0 away draw with Gateshead two days after that. The Gateshead match was played at Boston United's York Street ground with the match having been postponed on four previous occasions. A further 0–0 draw was played out with Dartford just two days later. Newport got back to winning ways with their second victory over Nuneaton Town two days after that. Following a 0–0 away draw with Cambridge United a place in the play-offs was secured with a 1–0 home victory over Braintree Town which also represented the seventh double of the season. Newport finished their home season with victories over Macclesfield Town and Alfreton Town, the latter of which was played in torrential rain with large pools of standing water. The penultimate game of the season was a 2–2 away draw with Luton Town with the final game against fellow play-off contenders Grimsby Town. County manager Justin Edinburgh fielded a much-changed side, resting many first-team players ahead of the play-off matches. As a result, County lost 3–0 and set up a semi-final first leg back at Blundell Park four days later.

Play-offs
The County team that lined up against Grimsby in the semi-final first leg contained seven changes from the team that had played in the last league game. Grimsby, who boasted the best defensive record in the division, made only three changes. In a vastly different affair to the league game, County triumphed 1–0 as a result of an Ismail Yakubu header in the 89th minute.

As the second of the two semi-final second legs played County already knew that their potential opponents in the final would be Wrexham who had beaten Kidderminster Harriers 5–2 on aggregate. Taking the 1–0 lead into the home game County would only need a draw to make it to Wembley. However, in front of a Rodney Parade record crowd Christian Jolley scored the only goal of the game to make it 2–0 on aggregate and book County's place in the final.

In order to win the final and promotion County needed to beat Wrexham, something which they had failed to do on each of their previous six Conference meetings. The game was billed as a battle between the league's best midfield against the most potent strike force.
 Wrexham's midfielders had shut out the County attack for 86 minutes, until Wrexham's David Artell got his head to a ball over the top but couldn't deal with it completely and Christian Jolley latched on to it and lifted the ball over Chris Maxwell to give County the late advantage.

As Wrexham pushed for a leveller they were caught on the counter-attack in injury time and their fate was sealed. Aaron O'Connor hammered the ball into the roof of the net, at the second attempt, after his initial effort was saved by Maxwell, to prompt wild celebrations from the County players, management and fans.

Results summary

Results by round

Cup

FA Cup
County were drawn away to Yate Town of the Southern League Division One South & West. When the match was played County were the highest-placed club left in the competition and Yate the lowest. Despite taking the lead as early as the 6th minute, County found themselves 3–1 down by the 69th. With two minutes of time remaining Aaron O'Connor scored County's second and Tony James the equaliser in the 4th minute of injury time to force a replay at Rodney Parade.

The replay began in a similar fashion with O'Connor opening the scoring in the 43rd minute for County to lead 1–0 at half time. On 65 minutes David Pipe was sent off for a second yellow card and minutes later the visitors were awarded and scored a soft penalty. This tied the score at 1–1 and extra time was needed. With two late goals Yate progressed into the First Round proper.

FA Trophy
There was no repeat of the previous season's Wembley final for County as they lost their First Round FA Trophy match 0–2 away to Conference South Welling United. Welling themselves went on to become champions of Conference South.

Squad statistics
(Substitute appearances in brackets)

Transfers

In

Out

Loans in

Loans out

Fixtures and results

Pre-season friendlies

Conference National

Play-offs

Final

FA Cup

FA Trophy

League table

External links
 Newport County AFC 2012-2013 : Results
 Newport County's results from season 2012/2013

References

2012-13
2012–13 Football Conference by team
Welsh football clubs 2012–13 season